The House at 199 Summer Avenue in Reading, Massachusetts is designated as historic. The original two-and-a-half-story house was designed by architect Horace G. Wadlin and built in 1878 for Robert Kemp, leader of the popular Old Folks Concerts. The house was the second in Reading that Kemp had built; the first also is still standing.

Originally built in the Second Empire style with a mansard roof, the house was extensively altered in the 1890s, when its mansard roof was removed and Tudor Revival styling was added.

The house was listed on the National Register of Historic Places in 1984.

See also
National Register of Historic Places listings in Reading, Massachusetts
National Register of Historic Places listings in Middlesex County, Massachusetts

References

Houses on the National Register of Historic Places in Reading, Massachusetts
Houses completed in 1878
Houses in Reading, Massachusetts
1878 establishments in Massachusetts
Buildings with mansard roofs
Tudor Revival architecture in Massachusetts
Second Empire architecture in Massachusetts